Ultra Protection is a 1999 Hong Kong action crime drama television series produced by TVB and starring Bowie Lam, Mariane Chan, Cheung Siu-fai and Angie Cheung.

Plot
Po (Bowie Lam) was an OCTB sergeant before being expelled from the police force which led him to join his friend Kit's (Cheung Siu-fai) security company and was hired by rich man Nam (Kenneth Tsang) to be bodyguard of his only son Cho (Steven Ma). Po and Cho have different personalities and do not get along well however as times passes by, they develop a friendship. At the time Cho also falls in love with his father's friend's daughter Lam (Elaine Ng), but Lam develops feelings for Po instead. Kit's younger sister Fong (Mariane Chan), who had crush for Po for many years, learns of this and does everything possible to match Cho and Lam together.

Meanwhile, Po has been investigating about his wife's Wai (Wallis Pang) real murderer and by means pursue Yuk (Angie Cheong), who is linked with the triads. Unexpectedly, they unknowingling fell in love with each other. Later Cho's sister and Nam were suddenly kidnapped and Po also learns that the kidnapper is related to Wai's death and in work or private, he vows to battle with the kidnapper to the end. At the most critical time, Po finds out that he was betrayed all along.

Cast

Main cast

Other cast

External links
 Official website
 TVBI website

TVB dramas
1999 Hong Kong television series debuts
1999 Hong Kong television series endings
Hong Kong action television series
Serial drama television series
1990s Hong Kong television series